Theodoropolis is the name of a number of ancient cities ('-polis' being Greek for city) either named after a saint or a Roman Emperor, Theodoros, Theodore or Theodora, notably :

 Theodoropolis in Arcadia, in Egypt, also a diocese.
 Theodoropolis in Europa, in the Roman province of Europa (now European Turkey), also a former diocese, and Catholic titular see.
 Euchaneia, a center of the veneration of Saint Theodore of Amasea a town near or identical with Euchaita in the Roman province or Pontus in Asia Minor).
 Former Dorostolon, renamed after Byzantine empress Theodora, wife of John I Tzimisces.
 Former Silistra in Thrace, renamed after military saint Theodore Stratelates.